Anatrachyntis yunnanea is a moth in the family Cosmopterigidae. It was described by Zagulajav in 1959, and is known from Yunnan, China, from which its species epithet is derived.

References

Moths described in 1959
Anatrachyntis
Moths of Asia